Martin Lo-A-Njoe (born 23 August 1969) is a Dutch composer, he has been living in the Netherlands since 1972.

Education
Martin Lo-A-Njoe studied at the Sweelinck Conservatory in Amsterdam (nowadays The Amsterdam Conservatory), composition with well-known composer Daan Manneke, and theory and instrumentation with, among others, Theo Verbey and Geert van Keulen.
In the same period he studied ethnomusicology at the University of Amsterdam.

Activities
During his study period, Lo-A-Njoe's music was performed in the Beurs van Berlage during a festival, curated by well-known Dutch composer Theo Loevendie, who was affiliated with the Amsterdam Conservatory at the time. Also the Amstel Saxophone Quartet performed his music in the chamber music series at the Amsterdam Stedelijk Museum (Municipal Museum for modern art). After his studies, Lo-A-Njoe worked during a number of years as a pianist for various professional ballet schools, and for the dance company of Krisztina de Châtel.
In 2004 he collaborated with writer Trudy van der Wees on a theatre production, for which he wrote the music, and which went on a very successful tour through the Netherlands.
Furthermore, for a number of years he worked at the Netherlands Music Institute (NMI) on the ordering and categorisation of the extensive music archives, which cover music composed in the Netherlands from the 19th century onwards. 
In 2013 the trio 'To Be Sung' performed arrangements by Lo-A-Njoe of songs by the Armenian composer Grikor Mirzaian Suni.
Martin Lo-A-Njoe wrote a number of works for the Huygens Fokker Foundation, the Dutch center for microtonal music, which were performed at various festivals in the Muziekgebouw aan 't IJ (the specialized venue for new music in Amsterdam), among which the Gaudeamus Music Week 2010 and the World Minimal Music Festival 2015. In this edition Terry Riley was a special guest. 
In 2020 an early work by Lo-A-Njoe was performed at a concert with the theme 'Surinaams Klassiek' (Classical composers from Surinam) in the Museum van Loon by violinist Yannick Hiwat and pianist Roderigo Robles de Medina.

Compositions (Excerpt)

Works for Percussion 
 1996 - ‘’Four Mallets’’, for 4 marimba’s and 1 vibraphone

Theatre Music 
 2004 - ‘’Musical Dr.Quinn’’, dutch Musical bases on the television series Dr. Quinn, Medicine Woman; vocal score

Arrangementen vocaal 
 2013 - ‘’Three Armian songs by Grikor Suni’’, for voice, clarinet/ bassclarinet and cello

Works for 31-tone Fokker organ
 2010 - ‘’Toccata’’, for 31-toons Fokker-organ and laptop
 2011 - ’’Pas de deux’’, for 31-tone Fokker-organ and 96-tone Carrillo-piano

Chamber music 
 1992 - ‘’Mystique’’for violin and piano
 1998 - ‘’Impressies’’ on three Spanish texts by Rodrigo Barrientos-Aravena
 2016 - ’’Moving Parts’’for string quartet (2vn, vla, vc)
 2017 - ’’Swing’’ for Saxophone Quartet (sop, alt, tenor, bariton)

External links
 Official website of Martin Lo-A-Njoe
 Martin Lo-A-Njoe page at Donemus/MuziekGroup Nederland 
 Concert Fokker organ in combination with Dance | Muziekgebouw aan 't IJ
 Official website of Trudy van der Wees copywriter | cooperation page
 Ensemble Scala for microtonal Music
 Newspaper announcement about the dutch musical Dr.Quinn
 Ensemble trio To Be Sung | Audio examples

References

Dutch male classical composers
Dutch classical composers
20th-century classical composers
20th-century Dutch composers
20th-century Dutch male musicians
21st-century classical composers
21st-century Dutch composers
21st-century male musicians
1969 births
Living people